The Poultry Cooperative Research Centre, or Poultry CRC, was a joint venture established and supported under the Australian Government's Cooperative Research Centres Programme.

The Poultry CRC's major challenge was to help Australia achieve sustainable, ethical poultry production in the face of population growth and climate change.

In July 2008, the Poultry CRC won the World's Poultry Science Association (WPSA) Industry/Organisation Award at the World's Poultry Congress in Brisbane in recognition of an outstanding contribution to the development of the poultry industry. In August 2012 the Poultry CRC was awarded WPSA's Education Award at the World's Poultry Congress in Brazil for their exceptional contribution to poultry education. In addition, the Poultry CRC received an Australian Collaborative Innovation Award in May 2012.

Structure of the CRC  

The Poultry CRC was an unincorporated joint venture between seven Essential Participants and was governed by a skills-based board. It managed its research and development programs through a public company, Poultry CRC Ltd. The Poultry CRC was headquartered at the University of New England in Armidale, New South Wales, and had an extensive collaborative network comprising researchers, educators and support staff from its participating organisations. The original Poultry CRC was established on 1 July 2003, with the subsequent CRC an extension to 2017.

Essential Participants  
Australian Egg Corporation Limited
Bioproperties Pty Ltd
Commonwealth Scientific and Industrial Research Organisation (CSIRO) Livestock Industries
Department of Agriculture, Fisheries and Forestry (formerly DEEDI) Queensland
Rural Industries Research and Development Corporation (RIRDC) Chicken Meat Program
University of Melbourne
University of New England

Other Participants 

Active Research Pty Ltd
Alltech Biotechnology
Aviagen
Baiada Poultry
Cordina Chicken Farms
D.A. Hall & Co.
Deakin University
Feedworks
FSA Consulting
Golden Cockerel
Hazeldene's Chicken Farm
Hy-line
Inghams Enterprises
La Ionica
Monash University
Murdoch Children's Research Institute (MCRI)
Northern Poultry Cluster 
Nutreco
Pepe's Ducks
Red Lea Chickens
Scolexia
The South Australian Research and Development Institute (SARDI)
Ohio State University
University of Adelaide
University of New South Wales
University of Queensland
University of Sydney
University of Western Australia
Zoetis
Zootechny

Poultry CRC Research Programs 

Three integrated Programs addressed the challenge of meeting increasing demand for 'clean and green' poultry products and maintaining food security in the face of climate change and population growth.

Research activities focused on three key areas:

maintaining poultry health and enhancing bird welfare;
improving resource utilisation and reducing environmental impacts of poultry production; and
controlling poultry product-associated food safety issues and enhancing egg quality for consumers.

Program 1 - Health and Welfare - aimed to maintain a sustainable, healthy and welfare conscious supply of poultry products despite newly emerging pathogens, increasing environmental concerns about production and changing consumer demands. For many diseases, current vaccines fail to offer complete protection. Changes in production, including reduced reliance on antibiotics and increased use of free-range systems, require a complete reconsideration of protection strategies. The CRC brings together the world's best research and capability providers in diagnostics, animal health products and welfare to develop a holistic solution. This program of highly integrated projects builds on the success of the first CRC while adding key capabilities, such as vaccine delivery methods, mass sequencing of antigens, and therapeutics.

Program 2 – Nutrition and Environment - addressed resource utilisation and reduction of environmental impacts, including the emission of odours and greenhouse gases (GHG).

Program 3 – Safe and Quality Food Production - focused on controlling food-borne illnesses related to poultry products (i.e., Campylobacter for chicken meat and Salmonella for eggs) and addressed major consumer dissatisfaction associated with inconsistency in egg quality.

Thirty-five postgraduates were integrated within the three Programs' research projects, involving immediate and direct interaction with end-users. The CRC expected several to find direct employment with industry, some through its internships program.

Areas of research expertise 
 Animal welfare
 Digestive physiology
 Environmental impacts
 Feed manufacture and formulation
 Immunology and microbiology
 Molecular and quantitative genetics
 Nutrition
 Vaccines and diagnostics

See also 

 Cooperative Research Centre
 Department of Innovation, Industry, Science and Research

References

External links 
PoultryHub
CRC Programme website
CRC Association (CRCA) website

Agricultural organisations based in Australia
Food technology organizations
Research institutes in Australia
Poultry farming in Australia
Poultry research institutes